William Henry Draper may refer to:

 William Henry Draper (judge) (1801–1877), lawyer, judge and political figure in Upper Canada and Canada West
 William Henry Draper (congressman) (1841–1921), Republican from New York
 William Henry Draper Jr. (1894–1974), U.S. army officer, banker, and diplomat
 William Henry Draper III (born 1928), American businessman, son of William Henry Draper, Jr.
 William Henry Draper (hymnwriter) (1855–1933), British clergyman and hymnwriter

See also
 William Draper (disambiguation)